Michael Rexford Nicolette (born December 7, 1956) is an American professional golfer and inventor who played on the PGA Tour in the 1970s and 1980s.

Nicolette was born in Pittsburgh, Pennsylvania. He attended Rollins College in Winter Park, Florida and was a member of the golf team. While a student at Rollins, he won the 1976 NCAA Division II Men's Golf Championship. He turned pro in 1978.

Nicolette had ten top-10 finishes in PGA Tour events during his career including a win at the 1983 Bay Hill Classic. In that tournament, he defeated Greg Norman in a playoff on the first extra hole. He was the first round co-leader at the 1988 U.S. Open, but faded in the last three days. His best finish in a major championship was T-13 at the 1983 U.S. Open.

Parsons Xtreme Golf (PXG) hired Nicolette, who served as senior product designer for PING prior to joining PXG. Given no time or budget constraints, Nicolette worked on designing the first iteration of what would become the PXG 0311 forged iron.

Nicolette is named as an inventor on 179 US Utility Patents , the majority of which are assigned to PXG. He is also named on 255  US Design Patents.

Amateur wins
1976 NCAA Division II Championship

Professional wins (2)

PGA Tour wins (1)

PGA Tour playoff record (1–0)

Other wins (1)
1999 Arizona Open

Results in major championships

Note: Nicolette never played in The Open Championship.

CUT = missed the half-way cut
"T" = tied

See also
Spring 1979 PGA Tour Qualifying School graduates
Fall 1981 PGA Tour Qualifying School graduates
1985 PGA Tour Qualifying School graduates

References

External links

American male golfers
PGA Tour golfers
Golfers from Pittsburgh
Rollins Tars athletes
1956 births
Living people